Caleb Lee Hutchinson (born March 2, 1999) is an American singer-songwriter, and runner-up on the sixteenth season of American Idol.

Early life
Caleb Lee Hutchinson was born in Dallas, Georgia, to William and Piper Hutchinson. He has a brother Tyler. He started playing guitar when he was 12, attended South Paulding High School, and graduated in 2017. In 2015, at age 16, Hutchinson appeared on The Voice on the contest's 9th season auditioning with "The Dance", but none of the presiding judges Adam Levine, Gwen Stefani, Pharrell Williams and Blake Shelton turned their chair, and Hutchinson was eliminated from the show.

American Idol
In 2018, he auditioned to season 16 of American Idol with the song "If It Hadn't Been for Love" from The SteelDrivers. All three judges Lionel Richie, Katy Perry and Luke Bryan voted "yes" for him to continue. During the season, he sang "Die a Happy Man" (Top 24), "Midnight Train to Memphis" (Top 14), "You've Got a Friend in Me" (Top 10), "When Doves Cry and "Amazed" (Top 7),  "So Small" and "Stars in Alabama" (Top 5) qualifying for the shows' finale. On May 20, 2018, he performed "Don't Close Your Eyes", "Folsom Prison Blues" and his single was "Johnny Cash Heart" finishing runner-up to winner Maddie Poppe.

From the time he first appeared on the show until the end of the season he lost about 70 pounds. During the final, Caleb declared that he and winner Maddie Poppe were dating.

Music career

Hutchinson's song on American Idol, "Johnny Cash Heart", was released after his performance on the show. The song charted at No. 16 on the Country Digital Song Sales chart on its first week of release.

On 28 June 2019, Hutchinson released a self-titled EP, produced by Kristian Bush of Sugarland. Two songs from the EP, "Left of Me" and a cover of Post Malone's song "Better Now" were first released in January 2019.

Discography

Extended plays

Singles

References

External links
 Hutchinson Caleb Lee Hutchinson on American Idol
 

American Idol participants
The Voice (franchise) contestants
Living people
1999 births
21st-century American singers
Singers from Georgia (U.S. state)
21st-century American male singers